Claude Bettinger  was a sculptor and stained glass artist. Born in Lyon in 1942, he died in Quebec in 1998.

Biographical notes 
 He grew up in Alsace.
 He arrived in Quebec in 1952.
 In 1963, he graduated from the École des Beaux-Arts de Montréal.
 He pursued further studies at the Louvre.
 He taught at the École des Beaux-Arts de Montréal from 1967 to 1968.
 He taught at the Université du Québec à Trois-Rivières from 1971 to 1973.

Famous works 
Several of Claude Bettinger's works occupy prominent public spaces in Montreal and Quebec: 

 In the Montreal Metro, two stained glass installations at Côtes-des-Neiges Metro Station
 Numerous stained glass works in chapels, churches and buildings throughout the Province of Quebec

Honours 
 Royal Canadian Academy of Arts

References

1942 births
1998 deaths
Members of the Royal Canadian Academy of Arts
École des beaux-arts de Montréal alumni
Academic staff of the École des beaux-arts de Montréal